The Sermon! is an album by jazz organist Jimmy Smith. It was produced by the Blue Note record label, and was Smith's fifteenth album in three years. AllMusic's Lindsay Planer described the album as "a prime example of Smith and company's myriad of talents."

Background
The Sermon was the second of two albums recorded on two dates at The Manhattan Towers Hotel Ballroom, the first was Smith's previous album, House Party (1958). Rudy Van Gelder used the ballroom as a recording studio for recording sessions in 1957-1958, while he was still using his parents' Hackensack, New Jersey home studio to record artists for Blue Note. He mainly used it for larger groups of musicians that would not fit in his parents' living room, or when New York was a more convenient location to record the artists involved.

Track listing
 "The Sermon" (Jimmy Smith) – 20:12
 "J.O.S." (Smith) – 11:56
 "Flamingo" (Edmund Anderson, Ted Grouya) – 8:02

Recorded on August 25, 1957 (#2) and February 25, 1958 (#1, 3).

Personnel

Musicians
Tracks 1 & 3
 Jimmy Smith – organ
 Lee Morgan – trumpet
 Kenny Burrell – guitar
 Art Blakey – drums
 Lou Donaldson – alto saxophone (track 1 only)
 Tina Brooks – tenor saxophone (track 1 only)

Track 2
 Jimmy Smith – organ
 Lee Morgan – trumpet
 George Coleman – alto saxophone
 Eddie McFadden – guitar
 Donald Bailey – drums

Technical
 Alfred Lion – producer
 Rudy Van Gelder – engineer
 Reid Miles – design
 Francis Wolff – photography
 Ira Gitler – liner notes

References

1959 albums
Jimmy Smith (musician) albums
Blue Note Records albums